William Thomas Somers (June 19, 1916March 14, 1994) was the 26th Mayor of Atlantic City, New Jersey from 1969 to 1972.

Biography
He was born on June 19, 1916 in Atlantic City, New Jersey. He was a Republican. As Mayor, Somers was convicted of extortion under color of official right.

He died at Shore Medical Center on March 14, 1994.

References

1916 births
1994 deaths
Mayors of Atlantic City, New Jersey
Politicians convicted of extortion under color of official right
New Jersey politicians convicted of crimes
New Jersey Republicans
20th-century American politicians